Yellow Creek Township is a township in Chariton County, in the U.S. state of Missouri.

Yellow Creek Township was established in 1840, and named after the Yellow Creek.

References

Townships in Missouri
Townships in Chariton County, Missouri